Antoine Rière (16 December 1891 – 12 February 1927) was a French racing cyclist. He rode in the 1923 Tour de France.

References

1891 births
1927 deaths
French male cyclists
Place of birth missing